Aubach is a river of Rhineland-Palatinate, Germany. It springs southeast of the waste management plant Linkenbach. On its course, it traverses the reservoir Schwanenteich near in borough  of Neuwied. It is a left tributary of the Wied in the borough Niederbieber of Neuwied.

In Oberbieber, two bridges lead across the Aubach which are both protected monuments.

See also
List of rivers of Rhineland-Palatinate

References 

Rivers of Rhineland-Palatinate
Rivers of the Westerwald
Rivers of Germany